Robert Grdović (born 23 February 1974) is a Croatian futsal manager and former player.

Playing career 
During his futsal career, Grdović played for the clubs Uspinjača Zagreb (Croatia), Cagliari Futsal (Italy), Genzano Calcio a 5 (Italy), Petar (Croatia), Gospić (Croatia), Split (Croatia), and Zapad (Croatia).

He also played for the Croatian national futsal team, making 56 appearances between 1998 and 2008. He retired in 2011.

Coaching career 
As a football coach, he was a manager of the Croatian teams Zapad and Nacional Zagreb. Grdović also worked as the coach-consultant of the Croatian national futsal team.

With the cooperation of the Croatian Football Federation and the Football Federation of Turkmenistan, it was announced in March 2019 that Grdović would take over the Turkmenistan national futsal team.

In March 2020, Grdović left the team due to the expiration of the contract and the postponement of matches of the 2020 AFC Futsal Championship.

References

External links
Croatian Football Federation profile

1974 births
Living people
People from Sindelfingen
Sportspeople from Stuttgart (region)
Croatian men's futsal players
Croatian expatriate sportspeople in Italy
Expatriate sportspeople in Italy
Croatian expatriate sportspeople in Slovenia
Expatriate sportspeople in Slovenia
Expatriate sportspeople in Turkmenistan